Raja Tapatrao Anandrao Pawar (born 1967) is the current Raja of Daher. He is the one of the five Kings of Dang which are the only hereditary royals in India whose titles are currently recognized by the government of India 
owing to an agreement made during the British Raj in 1842.

See also 
 Dang district, India
 Surat Agency
 List of current constituent Asian monarchs
Daher, Dang

References 

Dang district, India
20th-century Indian royalty
1967 births
Living people